Progress MS-06, identified by NASA as Progress 67P, was a Progress spaceflight operated by Roscosmos to resupply the International Space Station (ISS). It was launched on 14 June 2017.

History 
The Progress-MS is an uncrewed freighter based on the Progress-M featuring improved avionics. This improved variant first launched on 21 December 2015. It had the following improvements:
 New external compartment that enables it to deploy satellites. Each compartment can hold up to four launch containers. First time installed on Progress MS-03.
 Enhanced redundancy thanks to the addition of a backup system of electrical motors for the docking and sealing mechanism.
 Improved Micrometeoroid (MMOD) protection with additional panels in the cargo compartment.
 Luch Russian relay satellites link capabilities enable telemetry and control even when not in direct view of ground radio stations.
 GNSS autonomous navigation enables real time determination of the status vector and orbital parameters dispensing with the need of ground station orbit determination.
 Real time relative navigation thanks to direct radio data exchange capabilities with the space station.
 New digital radio that enables enhanced TV camera view for the docking operations.
 The Ukrainian Chezara Kvant-V on board radio system and antenna/feeder system has been replaced with a Unified Command Telemetry System (UCTS).
 Replacement of the Kurs A with Kurs NA digital system.

Launch 
Progress MS-06 launched on 14 June 2017 from the Baikonur Cosmodrome in Kazakhstan, at 09:20:13 UTC. It used a Soyuz-2.1a rocket to get to orbit, replacing the former Soyuz-U launch system.

Docking 
Progress MS-06 docked with the Zvezda. It was planned to dock with the Pirs module which it would remove from the space station, in preparation for the arrival of the Nauka module. However, due to the repetitive delays with the Nauka module the plan was postponed to Progress MS-09. After a two-day rendezvous, Progress MS-06 docked to the station on 16 June 2017 at 11:37 UTC.

Cargo 
The Progress MS-06 spacecraft delivered 2,450 kg of cargo and supplies to the International Space Station for the six-person crew. The following is a breakdown of cargo bound for the ISS:

 Fuel: 705 kg
 Oxygen and air: 50 kg
 Water: 420 kg

Orbit 
On 27 August 2017, Progress MS-06's engines were used for a 177-second burn to raise the ISS by around 0.97 km (average orbital altitude).

Undocking and decay 
Progress MS-06 undocked on 28 December 2017 and re-entered the atmosphere at 04:43 UTC. Its debris entered the Pacific Ocean at 04:51:34 UTC.

Launch fire 
The strap-on boosters ignited dry grass on impact 600 kilometers downrange from the Baikonur Cosmodrome causing a fire 15 km across. NPO Mashinostroyeniya employed workers to clear debris. One worker was killed and another hospitalized by the fires.

References 

Progress (spacecraft) missions
Spacecraft launched in 2017
2017 in Russia
Supply vehicles for the International Space Station
Spacecraft launched by Soyuz-2 rockets
Spacecraft which reentered in 2017